Dancing with the Stars is a dance competition show airing on BBTV Channel 7 in Thailand. The show is the Thai version of the British television series Strictly Come Dancing. Sornram Teppitak, Thai actor and Thai pop singer, hosts with co-host Morakot Kittisara, Miss Thailand Universe 2004.

Cast

Presenters
Key:
 Current presenter of  Dancing with the Stars (Thailand)
 Previous presenter of  Dancing with the Stars (Thailand)

Judging panel

Key:
 Current judging panel
 Previous judge(s)
 Guest judge(s)

Season overview

References 

Thai
Thai reality television series
2013 Thai television series debuts
2013 Thai television series endings
Thai television series based on British television series
Channel 7 (Thailand) original programming